Ecclesiastes 4 is the fourth chapter of the Book of Ecclesiastes in the Hebrew Bible or the Old Testament of the Christian Bible. The book contains philosophical speeches by a character called '(the) Qoheleth' ("the Teacher"), composed probably between the fifth and second centuries BCE. Peshitta, Targum, and Talmud attribute the authorship of the book to King Solomon. This chapter discusses life's hardship and life's companions.

Text
The original text was written in Hebrew. This chapter is divided into 16 verses.

Textual witnesses
Some early manuscripts containing the text of this chapter in Hebrew are of the Masoretic Text, which includes Codex Leningradensis (1008).

There is also a translation into Koine Greek known as the Septuagint, made in the last few centuries BCE. Extant ancient manuscripts of the Septuagint version include Codex Vaticanus (B; B; 4th century), Codex Sinaiticus (S; BHK: S; 4th century), and Codex Alexandrinus (A; A; 5th century). The Greek text is probably derived from the work of Aquila of Sinope or his followers.

Structure
The New King James Version divides this chapter into four sections:
  = The Uselessness of Selfish Toil
  = The Vanity of Selfish Toil
  = The Value of a Friend
  = Popularity Passes Away

Oppression without comfort (4:1–3)
Following the reaction to the apparent perverted nature of the world in chapter 3, Qoheleth states that being dead or unborn is better than living to experience the horror of oppression, with little solace and no comforter for the oppressed. The solution may be hinted before (2:26; 3:22) but none is suggested here.

Verse 1
Then I returned and considered all the oppression that is done under the sun:
And look! The tears of the oppressed,
But they have no comforter—
On the side of their oppressors there is power,
But they have no comforter.
August Hahn suggests instead, And anew, I saw...

'All their Toil' (4:4–12)
Qoheleth uses the oppressed's loneliness to switch his focus to competition as the sole motive for work and skill, which also "vanity" to his view. It may lead on one hand to envy and rivalry, or on the other hand, the withdrawal from life altogether, folding of the hands that elsewhere is associated with sloth (cf. Proverbs 6:10; 24:33). This brings the argument that co-operation is better than competition, as pointed in verse 9, given illustrations in verses 10–12a and restated in 12b. The saying about the strength of a plaited cord in verse 12b resembles an ancient proverb found in the Epic of Gilgamesh.

Verse 4
 Again, I considered all travail, and every right work, that for this a man is envied of his neighbour. This is also vanity and vexation of spirit.
"Vanity": translated from the Hebrew word hebel which can refer to a "vapor" or "mere breath" (also in verses 7, 8, 16; cf. 1:2).

An isolated leader: Wise Youth, Foolish King (4:13–16)
In this part Qoheleth is again comparing one idea against another: a wise youth is better than one elderly king who becomes foolish, but the popularity of that youth will not last, for this person will soon be replaced by another youth and ultimately forgotten as the cycle keeps repeating. Two universally true points are that isolation is a part of the pain in human experience and that the next generation won't solve the problem of the previous one (cf. ). In any case, Qoheleth seems to be drawing out an implication of 1:11, that the true and important things at one moment will only be forgotten and swallowed up in repetition of time.

Verse 13
Better is a poor and a wise child than an old and foolish king, who will no more be admonished.
The elderly king was once wise (suggested by "no more"), but then lost his wisdom.

Musical settings

See also
 Related Bible parts: Ecclesiastes 1

Notes

References

Sources

External links

 Jewish translations:
 Kohelet – Ecclesiastes - Chapter 4 (Judaica Press) translation [with Rashi's commentary] at Chabad.org
 Christian translations:
 Online Bible at GospelHall.org (ESV, KJV, Darby, American Standard Version, Bible in Basic English)
 Ecclesiastes Chapter 4 King James Version
  Various versions

04